Babukhan (fl. 1328) (Chinese: 八不罕; Mongolian: Бабухан) was the wife of Taiding Emperor of the Yuan dynasty.  She served as regent in 1328.

Life 
Babukhan's father was either Woliuchar or Maizhuhan, both grandsons of Anchen. She was established as empress in the third month of the first year of Taiding's reign (1324). 

Her husband died four years later in Shangdu and their son Ragibagh succeeded him with the reign name Tianshun. Babukhan ruled as regent with the title empress dowager. Soon after a minister named El Temür led a coup in Dadu and placed Tugh Temür, second son of Emperor Külüg Khan and on the throne as Wenzong. 

It is unknown what became of Tianshun after the war. Babukhan and all of Taiding's wives and concubines were taken into El Temür's harem. She wasn't given a posthumous due to the fact that she wasn't considered legitimate empress by Tugh Temür.

Notes

Year of birth missing
Yuan dynasty empresses
14th-century Chinese women
14th-century Chinese people
14th-century women rulers
14th-century Mongolian women